Oskari Siiki (born May 5, 1995) is a Finnish professional ice hockey player. He is currently playing with TUTO Hockey in the Finnish Mestis.

Siiki made his SM-liiga debut playing with HC TPS during the 2012–13 SM-liiga season.

References

External links

1995 births
Living people
Espoo Blues players
Finnish ice hockey left wingers
SaPKo players
HC TPS players
Sportspeople from Turku
TuTo players